The North Carolina secretary of state election of 1944 took place on November 7, 1944. The incumbent Secretary of State, Thad A. Eure, chose to run for reelection and defeated Watt Gragg with 69.99% of the vote. Eure won his third of thirteen terms.

Results

References 

Secretrary of State
North Carolina Secretary of State elections
North Carolina
November 1944 events